Alltrans was an Australian logistics company. Established in 1950 by Peter Abeles and George Rockey with two second-hand trucks, its first contract was in Broken Hill. In 1966 a 35% share in the business was purchased by William Baird & Co of Scotland.

In 1967 it merged with Thomas Nationwide Transport to form TNT-Alltrans. By this stage it operated 500 trucks and had a presence in New Zealand.

The Alltrans name continued to be used when in 1969 Walkup's Merchants Express in the United States was purchased by TNT-Alltrans and renamed Alltrans Express. In 1983 TNT named a ship TNT Alltrans.

References

Companies based in Sydney
Defunct transport companies of Australia
Transport companies established in 1950
Transport companies disestablished in 1967
1967 disestablishments in Australia
Australian companies established in 1950